Young Love is the debut album by New Zealand R&B singer J. Williams, released on 13 July 2009 by Illegal Musik. It was a success, certified Gold by the Recording Industry Association of New Zealand (RIANZ). The album debuted on the New Zealand Albums Chart at number five, and has sold over 8000 copies.

Recording and production 
Described as an honest and open discourse into the life of Williams, the album, features guest appearances from fellow New Zealand rappers Mareko & Scribe, label mates Temple Jones, Erakah and D Love, plus a duet with his sister Lavina Williams.

Reception

Critical reception
Dane Anderson of More FM said that on Young Love "Williams thrives, on the faster, more rhythmic songs...While the slower songs aren't quite up to the par of say Usher or Ne-Yo just yet, you can't deny the catchiness in them."

Commercial performance
Young Love peaked at its debut position of number five on the New Zealand Album Chart before falling out after eight weeks. It then re-entered the chart after the release of the Collectors Edition, and was certified Gold, selling over 7,500 copies. The album spent a total of twenty-eight weeks in the album chart.

Singles 
 "Blow Your Mind" peaked at number thirteen on the RIANZ New Zealand Singles Chart.
 "Set It Off" was released to commercial radio stations in early 2009, and it charted on the official RIANZ Top 40 singles chart, peaking at number thirty-six.
 "Ghetto Flower" peaked at number five on the RIANZ chart and was certified gold on 9 June 2009, as it has sold over 7,500 copies in New Zealand.
"Stand with You" featured Williams' sister, Lavina Williams. It peaked at number six and was certified Gold after 10 weeks on the chart.
"Your Style featured Erakah, and peaked at number sixteen on the New Zealand Singles Chart in its fourth non-consecutive week on that chart.
"You Got Me", featuring rapper Scribe, peaked at number one on the RIANZ chart, and was certified in its sixth week of charting.

Track listing

References

J. Williams (singer) albums
2009 debut albums